Ovadia is a given name and surname. Notable people with the name include:

Dvira Ovadia (born 1979), Israeli television personality and interior designer
Moni Ovadia (born 1946), Italian actor, musician, singer, and theatrical author
Robert Ovadia, Australian reporter
Ovadia Eli (born 1945), Israeli politician 
Ovadia Hedaya (1889–1969), Israeli rabbi
Ovadia Yosef (1918 or 1920 – 2013), Iraqi-born former Sephardi Chief Rabbi of Israel

See also
Obadiah (disambiguation)

Hebrew masculine given names
Hebrew-language surnames
Theophoric names